La Amada Inmóvil is a 1945  Argentine film directed and written by Luis Bayón Herrera. The film starred Santiago Gómez Cou and Yvonne Bastien as Ivonne De Lys. The film was based on the poem La Amada Inmóvil (The Immovable Loved One), written by Amado Nervo and published in 1922.

Cast 
Gloria Bernal   
Homero Cárpena   
Lía Casanova   
Dario Cossier   
Alfonso Ferrari Amores   
Santiago Gómez Cou  
Isabel Pradas
Margot Abad

External links
 

1945 films
Argentine black-and-white films
1940s Spanish-language films
Films directed by Luis Bayón Herrera
Argentine drama films
1945 drama films
1940s Argentine films